The Star-News is a community newspaper in Southern California. It serves the cities of Chula Vista, Bonita, Eastlake, Otay Ranch and National City. 
The Star-News was founded after a merger with the Chula Vista Star, founded in 1918, and National City News, founded in 1882. The paper publishes Neighbors, a free circular for the master-planned Otay Ranch and Eastlake communities of Chula Vista. The Star-News used to serve the city of Imperial Beach but stopped in 1995. Imperial Beach Eagle & Times would later serve Imperial Beach.

References

Weekly newspapers published in California
Chula Vista, California
Mass media in San Diego County, California
Companies based in San Diego County, California
Publications established in 1954